The blackwall hitch is a temporary means of attaching a rope to a hook.  Made of a simple half hitch over the hook, it will only hold when subjected to constant tension. It is used when the rope and hook are of equal size, but it is likely to slip if subjected to more than ordinary tension. Human life should never be trusted to it.

See also
List of knots

References